Woudrichem (Brabantian: Woerkum) is a city and former municipality in the province of North Brabant in the Netherlands.

History 

The city of Woudrichem was granted city rights in 1356.

Geography 

It is part of the region of Land van Heusden en Altena.

The city of Woudrichem is the largest settlement in the municipality. It is situated on the southbank of where the rivers Waal and Afgedamde Maas join to form the Boven Merwede. The other population centres in the municipality were:

 Almkerk
 Andel
 Bronkhorst
 Duizend Morgen
 Eng
 Giessen
 Oudendijk
 Rijswijk
 Stenenheul
 Uitwijk
 Uppel
 Waardhuizen
 Zandwijk

East of the city lies Loevestein Castle, on the other side of the river in the province of Gelderland.

Gallery

Government 
The municipal council of Woudrichem had 15 members. The mayor was Arie Noordergraaf of the Reformed Political Party. On January 1sth 2019 it joined Werkendam and Aalburg in the new municipality of Altena.

Notable people 
 Louwrens Hanedoes (1822 in Woudrichem - 1905 in Woudrichem) landscape painter; in the Romantic style, later turning to Realism.

References

External links 

 

Geography of Altena, North Brabant
Land van Heusden en Altena
Former municipalities of North Brabant
Populated places in North Brabant
Municipalities of the Netherlands disestablished in 2019

Cities in the Netherlands